Mouth breathing, medically known as chronic oral ventilation, is long-term breathing through the mouth. It often is caused by an obstruction to breathing through the nose, the innate breathing organ in the human body. Chronic mouth breathing may be associated with illness. The term "mouth-breather" has developed a pejorative slang meaning.

Etymology

In the early 20th century, "mouth-breather" was a technical term used by doctors to describe children who were breathing through their mouths due to an underlying medical condition. English lexicographer Jonathon Green notes that by 1915, the phrase "mouth-breather" had developed a pejorative connotation within English slang, defined as a "stupid person." Currently, the Macmillan Dictionary defines the term "mouth breather" as a pejorative noun that is used to mean "a stupid person."

Cause of inability for nasal breathing
Jason Turowski, MD of the Cleveland Clinic states that "we are designed to breathe through our noses from birth — it's the way humans have evolved." Infants for example in the first six to twelve months of postnatal can only use their noses to breathe unless crying is involved. Thus, the impact of chronic mouth breathing on health is a research area within orthodontics (and the related field of myofunctional therapy) and anthropology. It is classified into three types: obstructive, habitual, and anatomic.

There is a noted order of cause and effect leading to airway dysfuntion related to mouth breathing. This first starts with an inflammatory reaction then leading to tissue growth in the area which leads to airway obstruction and mouth breathing and then finally an altered face structure. 

Nasal breathing produces nitric oxide within the body, while mouth breathing does not. In addition, the Boston Medical Center notes that the nose filters out particles that enter the body, humidifies the air we breathe and warms it to body temperature. In contrast, however, mouth breathing "pulls all pollution and germs directly into the lungs; dry cold air in the lungs makes the secretions thick, slows the cleaning cilia, and slows down the passage of oxygen into the bloodstream." As a result, chronic mouth breathing may lead to illness. In about 85% of cases, it is an adaptation to nasal congestion, and frequently occurs during sleep. More specialized causes include: antrochoanal polyps; a short upper lip which prevents the lips from meeting at rest (lip incompetence); and pregnancy rhinitis which tends to occur in the third trimester of pregnancy.

Potential effects
Conditions associated with mouth breathing include cheilitis glandularis, Down syndrome, anterior open bite, tongue thrusting habit, cerebral palsy, ADHD, sleep apnea, and snoring. In addition, gingivitis, gingival enlargement, and increased levels of dental plaque are common in persons who chronically breathe through their mouths. The usual effect on the gums is sharply confined to the anterior maxillary region, especially the incisors (the upper teeth at the front). The appearance is erythematous (red), edematous (swollen) and shiny. This region receives the greatest exposure to airflow during mouth breathing, and it is thought that the inflammation and irritation is related to surface dehydration, but in animal experimentation, repeated air drying of the gums did not create such an appearance.

Breathing through the mouth decreases saliva flow. Saliva has minerals to help neutralize bacteria, clean off the teeth, and rehydrate the tissues. Without it, the risk of gum disease and cavities increases.

Chronic mouth breathing in children may affect dental and facial growth. It may also lead to the development of a long, narrow face, sometimes termed long face syndrome. Conversely, it has been suggested that a long thin face type, with corresponding thin nasopharyngeal airway, predisposes to nasal obstruction and mouth breathing.

Additional approaches to mouth breathing

George Catlin
George Catlin was a 19th-century American painter, author, and traveler, who specialized in portraits of Native Americans in the Old West. Travelling to the American West five times during the 1830s, he wrote about, and painted portraits that depicted, the life of the Plains Indians. He was also the author of several books, including The Breath of Life (later retitled as Shut Your Mouth and Save Your Life) in 1862. It was based on his experiences traveling through the West, where he observed a consistent lifestyle habit among the Native American communities he encountered: a preference for nose breathing over mouth breathing. He also observed that they had perfectly straight teeth. He repeatedly heard that this was because they believed that mouth breathing made an individual weak and caused disease, while nasal breathing made the body strong and prevented disease. He also observed that mothers repeatedly closed the mouth of their infants while they were sleeping, to instill nasal breathing as a habit.

Yoga
Yogis such as B. K. S. Iyengar advocated both inhaling and exhaling through the nose in the practice of yoga, rather than inhaling through the nose and exhaling through the mouth, using the phrase, "the nose is for breathing, the mouth is for eating."

Elsewhere in the animal kingdom
Lambs are noted to only switch to mouth breathing when the nasal passages are completely obstructed, with hypoxaemia having developed also as a result.

References

Further reading

External links

Effects of Mouth Breathing - WebMD (video clip)

 
 

Biological anthropology
Breathing abnormalities
Dentistry
Mouth
Orthodontics
Symptoms and signs: Respiratory system